Chatchai Sriworakan (born 13 August 1961) is a Thai naval officer. From 1 October 2020 to 30 September 2021, he served as commander-in-chief of the Royal Thai Navy. Somprasong Nilsamai was appointed as his successor.

References 

Living people
1961 births
Place of birth missing (living people)
Chatchai Sriworakan
Chatchai Sriworakan